The Anne Anne Kindergarten stabbing was a mass murder that occurred in a kindergarten at the Wan Lum Estate of Sham Shui Po, Kowloon, British Hong Kong, on 3 June 1982. After killing his mother and sister in their flat in Tai Kok Tsui, and also wounding two other women, 28-year-old Lee Chi Hang entered the kindergarten and stabbed 34 children, killing four of them, and also injured several other people, before he was arrested by police. Lee was found to be insane and was placed in a mental institution.

Incident
At around 1:30 pm, Lee stabbed his mother and sister in their flat, Room 5274, Block 8, Yuet Chun Estate (now Catherine House Estate), Tai Kok Tsui. They later died in hospital. Armed with two knives with eight-inch blades and two chisels, Lee ran downstairs, stabbing two sisters in the stairwell on the way, and fled to the Anne Anne Kindergarten, now Precious Bloods Children's School, located on the ground floor of Block 9 Wan Lum Estate. He entered the kindergarten, where 60 children between three and four years of age were having a singing lesson, and immediately began slashing and stabbing the children, leaving 34 of them wounded, six of them with their arms nearly severed, and four with fatal injuries.

One of the teachers shouted "follow me" to the students, causing many to run outside. She ran to the estate's neighbourhood policing unit on the ground floor of Block 10 for help. Two police officers arrived at the scene. Lee fled to the playground, where he stabbed constable Chan Kin Ming in the chest. Ignoring the injured policeman's orders to drop his weapons, Lee continued stabbing at passers-by, and wounded two men, a woman, and a 14-year-old boy who was decapitated later, before Chan stopped him with a shot to the left arm and stomach.

A total of 38 injured children were taken to Caritas Medical Centre while the injured police constable was taken to Princess Margaret Hospital. Chief Secretary Philip Haddon-Cave and other government officials, who had coincidentally been visiting the nearby Cheung Sha Wan fish market, arrived soon after to inspect the scene and offer condolences.

Victims

Killed
 Leung Lai-kuen, 48, Lee's mother
 Lee Shiu-kam, 17, Lee's sister
 Fung Kin-kwok , 3
 Tai Kai-lam , 3
 Lo Wing-sze, 4
 Kwan Pui-yen, 5

Wounded
 Two women (Kwong Sin Ngan, Kwong Sin Chun)
 30 unnamed children, ages 3 and 4
 Constable Chan Kin Ming
 Two unnamed men
 Unnamed woman
 Unnamed boy, 14

Perpetrator
Lee, who was diagnosed with schizophrenia, was the son of Lee Chiu Wing and Leung Lai Kuen. According to his father, he was a silent boy who did poorly in school, showed strange behaviour, and spoke incoherently. In 1976, he was admitted to Castle Peak Hospital, a mental institution, for six months, after fighting with a neighbour. He subsequently received treatment at the Yaumati Psychiatric Centre. Lee frequently had depression and threatened to kill his parents during an argument on New Year's Eve of 1979. In the time prior to the stabbing, he was unemployed and was said to have appeared emotionally unstable.

Aftermath
After the stabbing, security measures at nursery schools were upgraded, and it was made compulsory for discharged patients of mental institutions to regularly attend psychiatric out-patient clinics.

Lee was charged with six counts of murder, and in April 1983 he was sentenced to be detained in a mental hospital for an unspecified period. As of January 1998 he was still being held at the Siu Lam Psychiatric Centre in Tuen Mun.

In popular culture
The 1986 film The Lunatics by Derek Yee is based on the incident.

References

Murder in Hong Kong
Mass Murder in Hong Kong
School massacres
Mass murder in 1982
1982 crimes in Hong Kong
Mass stabbings in Asia
Deaths by stabbing in Hong Kong
June 1982 events in Asia
Knife attacks
1980s murders in Hong Kong
1982 murders in Asia